Harry H. Pfeiffer (died October 1970) was an American politician. He served as a Republican member for the 72nd district of the Florida House of Representatives.

Pfeiffer moved to Cocoa Beach, Florida in the 1950s. In 1967, he was elected as a member for the newly established 72nd district of the Florida House of Representatives.  In October 1967 he was accused of making false campaign reports but the charges were dismissed the following January. In March 1968 Pfeiffer announced that he would not run for re-election, and he was succeeded by Richard J. Tillman in 1970.

On October 20, 1970, Pfeiffer was found dead in the sea off Cocoa Beach, Florida with an apparently self-inflicted gunshot wound.

References 

Place of birth missing
Year of birth missing
1970 deaths
1970 suicides
Republican Party members of the Florida House of Representatives
20th-century American politicians
Deaths by drowning in the United States
Deaths from asphyxiation